Onil Doiron was a Canadian politician. He served in the Legislative Assembly of New Brunswick from 1974 to 1982, as a Liberal member for the constituency of Caraquet.

References

New Brunswick Liberal Association MLAs
Living people
People from Caraquet
Year of birth missing (living people)